Pierre-Richard Menault (1642–1694) was a French Baroque composer.

Menault was born at Beaune.  While a provincial chapel master and priest at Dijon, he printed vespers dedicated to Père François de la Chaise, confessor of Louis XIV.  He died at Dijon.

Works, editions and recordings
 Masses 1676, 1686, 1687, 1691, 1692.
 Vêpres pour le Pére la Chaize.  recording Greuillet, Jaroussky, Janssens, Lombard, van Dyck. Ensemble La Fenice, Jean Tubéry. K617

References

1642 births
1694 deaths
French male classical composers
Musicians from Dijon
17th-century classical composers
French Baroque composers
People from Beaune
17th-century male musicians